Toluwalase "Tolu" Emmanuel Arokodare (born 23 November 2000) is a Nigerian professional footballer who plays as a centre-forward for Belgian club Genk.

Career
During his youth in Nigeria, Arokodare played for Kash Academy and Flying Sports Academy in Festac, as well as the Segun Odegbami International College and Sports Academy. He later joined the Box2Box FC academy in Surulere, Lagos, and had trials with European clubs SC Freiburg and Toulouse. He then joined Latvian club Valmiera in June 2019. In September 2020, Arokodare was loaned to German club 1. FC Köln for the 2020–21 season. He made his professional debut for Köln in the Bundesliga on 26 September 2020, coming on as a substitute in the 76th minute for Sebastian Andersson in the away match against Arminia Bielefeld, which finished as a 1–0 loss. On 28 June 2021, Arokodare joined Ligue 2 club Amiens on a two-year loan deal with an option to buy.

On 31 January 2023, Arokodare joined Belgian Pro League side Genk on a permanent deal, signing a four-and-a-half year deal, scoring on his debut as substitute against Gent in a 3-2 away win.

Personal life
Arokodare was born in Festac Town in Lagos, Nigeria.

References

External links
 
 
 

2000 births
Living people
Sportspeople from Lagos
Nigerian footballers
Association football forwards
Valmieras FK players
1. FC Köln players
Amiens SC players
K.R.C. Genk players
Latvian Higher League players
Bundesliga players
Ligue 2 players
Belgian Pro League players
Nigerian expatriate footballers
Nigerian expatriate sportspeople in Latvia
Expatriate footballers in Latvia
Nigerian expatriate sportspeople in Germany
Expatriate footballers in Germany
Nigerian expatriate sportspeople in France
Expatriate footballers in France
Nigerian expatriate sportspeople in Belgium
Expatriate footballers in Belgium